Delias durai is a species of butterfly in the family Pieridae. It is found in Papua New Guinea. The type location is the Foja Mountains.

See also
List of butterflies of Papua New Guinea

References

durai
Butterflies of Oceania
Lepidoptera of Papua New Guinea
Butterflies described in 2006